Asara District is in Karaj County, Alborz province, Iran. At the 2006 census, its population was 18,856, in 5,407 households. The census of 2016 counted 
17,150 people in 5,977 households.

References 

Karaj County

Districts of Alborz Province

Populated places in Alborz Province

Populated places in Karaj County